al-Shehri (also transliterated as Alshehri, Shehri, or Shihri) is an Arabic family name denoting a member of Bani Shehr, when followed by a sun letter, the l in al assimilates to the initial consonant of the following noun, resulting in a doubled consonant.

People
 Fouzi Al-Shehri (born 1980), Saudi footballer
 Yahya Al-Shehri (born 1991), Saudi footballer

Arabic-language surnames